Wonderboom South is a northern residential suburb of Pretoria, South Africa. It lies to the south of the Wonderboom, on the slopes of the Magaliesberg mountains.

References

Suburbs of Pretoria